France had several client states between 1792–1815 (the French First Republic and the First French Empire) and 1852–1870 (the Second French Empire).

Sister Republics

Former Holy Roman Empire
 Rauracian Republic 
  Republic of Mainz 
  Cisrhenian Republic 
 Republic of Bouillon

Italy
 Republic of Crema 
 Cispadane Republic 
Bolognese Republic 
 Transpadane Republic 
 Republic of Alba 
Republic of Brescia 
Republic of Bergamo 
 Cisalpine Republic 
 Italian Republic 
 Anconine Republic 
 Ligurian Republic 
 Tiberina Republic 
 Roman Republic 
Altamura 
 Subalpine Republic 
 Piedmontese Republic 
 Parthenopean Republic 
 Republic of Pescara 
 Republic of Lucca 
 Astese Republic 
Republic Reggiana 
 Gozo

Rest of Europe
  
 Helvetic Republic 
Canton of Léman 
 Rhodanic Republic 
Rauracian Republic 
 Free City of Danzig 
 Republic of Connacht 
 Septinsular Republic

Africa
 Republic Swellendam 
 Republic Graaff-Reinet

Client states of the First Empire
 
 Principality of Elba

Former Holy Roman Empire
 County of Wetzlar (1803–1810)
 Principality of Erfurt (1807–1814)
Confederation of the Rhine (1806–1813)
 Forest- and Rhine-County of Salm-Horstmar (1803–1813)
County of Salm-Reifferscheid-Dyck (1806–1811)
 Grand Duchy of Baden
 Kingdom of Bavaria
 Grand Duchy of Berg
 Grand Duchy of Hesse-Darmstadt
 Principality of Regensburg (1803–1810)
 Kingdom of Saxony
 Kingdom of Westphalia (1807–1813)
 Kingdom of Württemberg
 Grand Duchy of Würzburg (1806–1814)
 Duchy of Anhalt-Bernburg (1807–1813)
 Duchy of Anhalt-Dessau (1807–1813)
 Duchy of Anhalt-Köthen (1807–1813)
 Duchy of Arenberg (1803–1810)
 Principality of Hohenzollern-Hechingen
 Principality of Hohenzollern-Sigmaringen
 Principality of Isenburg (1806–1815)
 Principality of Leyen (1806–1814)
 Principality of Liechtenstein
 Principality of Lippe-Detmold (1807–1813)
 Duchy of Mecklenburg-Schwerin (1808–1813)
 Duchy of Mecklenburg-Strelitz (1808–1813)
 Duchy of Nassau
 Duchy of Oldenburg (1808–1813)
 Principality of Reuss-Ebersdorf (1807–1813)
 Principality of Reuss-Greiz (1807–1813)
 Principality of Reuss-Lobenstein (1807–1813)
 Principality of Reuss-Schleiz (1807–1813)
 Principality of Salm (1802–1810)
 Duchy of Saxe-Coburg
 Duchy of Saxe-Gotha
 Duchy of Saxe-Hildburghausen
 Duchy of Saxe-Meiningen
 Duchy of Saxe-Weimar (1806–1809)
 Duchy of Saxe-Eisenach (1806–1809)
 Grand Duchy of Saxe-Weimar-Eisenach (1809–1813)
 Principality of Schaumburg-Lippe (1807–1813)
 Principality of Schwarzburg-Rudolstadt (1807–1813)
 Principality of Schwarzburg-Sondershausen (1807–1813)
 Principality of Waldeck-Pyrmont (1807–1813)
 Grand Duchy of Frankfurt (1810–1813)
 Principality of Aschaffenburg (1803–1810)

Italy
 Principality of Lucca and Piombino 
 Kingdom of Etruria 
 Kingdom of Italy 
 Kingdom of Naples 
 Principality of Pontecorvo 
 Grand Duchy of Tuscany 
 Principality of Benevento 
Duchy of Guastalla 
  Duchy of Massa and Carrara

Rest of Europe
 Principality of Neuchâtel 
 
 Duchy of Warsaw 
 Kingdom of Spain 
 Kingdom of Holland 
 Swiss Confederation

Second French Empire
 French Second Republic (1848–1852)
 Second French Empire (1852–1870)
 Second Mexican Empire (1863–1867)
 Principality of Andorra (1848–1870)

 
Political history of France
18th century in France
19th century in France
Client states